State Corporation ( lit. Gosudarstvennaya Korporatsiya) is a non-membership non-commercial organization, a type of legal entity in Russia introduced in 1999 (Article 7.1, NCO Law). Each state corporation is created by a separate Russian federal law.

These state corporations are non-profits established only under a federal law and are different from all the other organizations referred to in the mass media as "state corporations". They are regulated by bespoke legislation. According to the law, a state corporation is wholly owned by the Russian Federation directly, bypassing the Federal Agency for State Property Management.

For example, VEB was used as an off-budget funding vehicle for the state's special projects. VEB is overseen by a nine-member board that puts Dmitriyev together with seven government ministers and a representative of the Kremlin. An opaque organization held firmly controlled by President Vladimir Putin, Vneshekonombank (VEB) was used to finance the Winter Olympics in Sochi and extend Russian financial influence in Ukraine.

Full list of State corporations 
 Deposit Insurance Agency
 VEB.RF
 Fund of Housing and Communal Services Development Cooperation
 SC Olympstroy
 Rostec (formerly, Russian Technologies State Corporation - «Rostechnologii»)
 Rosatom
 Roscosmos

Former State corporations 
 Rusnano (now re-registered as Open joint-stock company)

See also
State corporation (generically)
 Types of business entity#Russia

References

Sources
 State Corporation goes for flow

Corporations